The discography of Swedish musician Niklas Strömstedt consists of eight studio albums, five compilation albums and 29 singles.

Albums

Studio albums

Compilation albums

Singles

See also 

 Glenmark Eriksson Strömstedt discography

References 

Discographies of Swedish artists
Discography
Pop music discographies
Rock music discographies